Ruszkowice may refer to the following places in Poland:
Ruszkowice, Lower Silesian Voivodeship (south-west Poland)
Ruszkowice, Masovian Voivodeship (east-central Poland)